Endre Otto Brunstad (born June 1, 1967) is a Norwegian linguist and professor of Nordic studies education at the University of Bergen's Institute of Linguistics, Literature, and Aesthetic Studies. Brunstad is from Sykkylven in Møre og Romsdal County. Brunstad was chairman of the Norwegian Language Association from 2003 to 2005, and he holds a PhD in Nordic linguistics. His research interests include language planning, linguistic purism, and language teaching.

References

External links 

BIBSYS: Publications by Publications by Endre Brunstad

1967 births
Living people
Linguists from Norway
People from Sykkylven
Academic staff of the University of Bergen